The following are the football (soccer) events of the year 1991 throughout the world.

Events 
UEFA Champions League 1991: Red Star Belgrade wins 5–3 on penalties over Olympique de Marseille after 0–0 draw.
FIFA Women's World Cup – United States wins 2–1 over Norway
For the first time since the Heysel Stadium disaster of 1985, English clubs are allowed to participate in competitions sponsored by UEFA, for the 1991–1992 season.
6 March – Feyenoord Rotterdam's coaching staff, led by Gunder Bengtsson and Pim Verbeek, is fired and replaced by former player Wim Jansen.
29 March – Diego Maradona is banned for fifteen months in the Italian Serie A after failing a drug test on cocaine.
18 May – Tottenham Hotspur wins 2–1 (after extra-time) over Nottingham Forest to claim the FA Cup.
2 June – Feyenoord Rotterdam claims the KNVB Cup by defeating FC Den Bosch in its own stadium, De Kuip. The only goal is scored by Rob Witschge in the 8th minute. The last seven minutes of the second half are cancelled due to hooligans invading the pitch.
5 June – Copa Libertadores is won by Colo-Colo after defeating Olimpia Asunción on an aggregate score of 3–0.
19 June – Slovenia plays its first ever international match, losing 1–0 to neighbouring Croatia in Murska Sobota.
 25 September – Asgeir Eliasson makes his debut as the manager of Iceland with a 2–0 win over Spain.
4 December – Peter Bosz makes his debut for the Netherlands national football team, replacing striker Wim Kieft after 85 minutes in the game against Greece.
8 December – Red Star Belgrade wins the Intercontinental Cup in Tokyo, Japan by defeating Chile's Colo-Colo 3–0. Vladimir Jugović scores twice for the Yugoslavs.

Winner club national championships

Asia

AFC Champions League
 1990-91 Winner: Iran - Esteghlal Runners Up:China - Liaoning F.C.
 1991 Winner: Saudi Arabia - AlHilal       Runners Up:Iran - Esteghlal

Europe
  – Arsenal
  – Olympique de Marseille
  – Sampdoria
 
Eredivisie – PSV Eindhoven
Eerste Divisie – De Graafschap
  – S.L. Benfica
 : For full coverage, see 1990-91 in Scottish football.
Scottish Premier Division – Rangers
Scottish Division One – Falkirk
Scottish Division Two – Stirling Albion
Scottish Cup – Motherwell
Scottish League Cup– Rangers
  – CSKA Moscow
  – Barcelona
  – Beşiktaş
  – 1. FC Kaiserslautern

North American
 – Vancouver 86ers (CSL)
 – UNAM
 – San Francisco Bay Blackhawks (APSL)

South America

1990/1991 – Newell's Old Boys
Apertura 1991 – River Plate
 – Bolívar
 – São Paulo
 Paraguay – Sol de América

International tournaments 
 Baltic Cup in Klaipėda, Lithuania
 
 
 
 CONCACAF Gold Cup in Los Angeles and Pasadena, United States
 
 
 
 Pan American Games in Havana, Cuba
 
 
 
 FIFA U-17 World Championship in Italy
 
 
 
 Copa América in Chile
 
 
 
 UNCAF Nations Cup in San José, Costa Rica
 
 
 
 FIFA Women's World Cup in China

National team results

Europe







South America







Births

January
 1 January: Michael Lucky Kelechuckwu, Nigerian footballer
 2 January
Luis Pedro Cavanda, Belgian footballer
 Sergei Petrov, Russian football player
Davide Santon, Italian footballer
 5 January:
Denis Alibec, Romanian footballer
Soner Aydoğdu, Turkish footballer
Rahel Kiwic, Swiss footballer
Dani Pacheco, Spanish footballer
 7 January:
 Eden Hazard, Belgian football player
 Alen Stevanović, Swiss-Serbian footballer
 8 January: 
Jorge Enríquez, Mexican international
Emiliano Tabone, Argentinian footballer
 21 January: 
 Mohammad Ghadir, Arab-Israeli footballer
 Alfredo Ortuño, Spanish footballer
 Luis Alfonso Rodríguez, Mexican international
 24 January: Ali Kireş, Turkish footballer

February
 3 February: Peter Pawlett, English footballer
 8 February:
 Aristidis Soiledis, Greek footballer
 Roberto Soriano, Italian footballer
 14 February:
 Daniela Mona Lambin, Estonian footballer
 Chris Rowney, English club footballer
 16 February: Sergio Canales, Spanish footballer
 20 February: 
 Giovanni Kyeremateng, Italian footballer
 Antonio Pedroza, English-Mexican footballer
 Christopher Tvrdy, Austrian footballer

March
 5 March
 Ramiro Funes Mori, Argentine footballer
 Rogelio Funes Mori, Argentine footballer
 23 March: Jorge Iván Bocanegra, Colombian footballer
 27 March: Jesse-Juho Kuusisto, Finnish footballer

April
 11 April: Niall Canavan, English-born Irish footballer
 20 April: Ondřej Kraják, Czech footballer

May
 1 May
Abdisalam Ibrahim, Norwegian footballer
Bartosz Salamon, Polish footballer
 27 May: Filip Starzyński, Polish international footballer

June
 3 June: Łukasz Teodorczyk, Polish international
 21 June: 
Gaël Kakuta, Congolese professional footballer
César Taján, Colombian club footballer
 23 June: Fakhreddine Ben Youssef, Tunisian international striker
 28 June: Kevin De Bruyne, Belgian international

July
 1 July: Lucas Vázquez, Spanish footballer
 13 July: Khairu Azrin Khazali, Malaysian footballer
 16 July: Andros Townsend, English international
 21 July: Tuan Muhamad Faim, Malaysian footballer
 23 July: Dedi Kusnandar, Indonesian footballer
 24 July: Riku Matsuda, Japanese club footballer

August
 12 August: Erik Fabbri, Italian footballer
 15 August: Filip Mladenović, Serbian football player
 20 August: 
Arseny Logashov, Russian international
Luke O'Neill, English youth international
Mario Tičinović, Croatian youth international
 25 August: Gershon Koffie, Ghanaian youth international

October
 10 October:  
Manuel Giandonato, Italian footballer
Xherdan Shaqiri, Swiss footballer
 24 October: Torstein Andersen Aase, Norwegian striker

November
 25 November: Luca Tremolada, Italian youth international

Deaths

February
 24 February – Georges Capdeville (91), French football referee

March
 9 March – Ely do Amparo, Brazilian defender, runner-up at the 1950 FIFA World Cup. (69)

May
 31 May – Rubens Josué da Costa, Brazilian forward, Brazilian squad member at the 1954 FIFA World Cup. (62)

July
 27 July – Gino Colaussi, Italian striker, winner of the 1938 FIFA World Cup, scoring two goals in the final. (77)

August
 9 August – Schubert Gambetta, Uruguayan defender, winner of the 1950 FIFA World Cup. (71)
 30 August – Adão Nunes Dornelles, Brazilian striker, runner-up at the 1950 FIFA World Cup. (68)

October
 11 October – Pietro Ferraris, Italian striker, winner of the 1938 FIFA World Cup. (79)

November
 15 November – Sylvio Hoffmann, Brazilian midfielder, Brazilian squad member at the 1934 FIFA World Cup. (83)

References

External links
  Rec.Sport.Soccer Statistics Foundation
  VoetbalStats

 
Association football by year